Enneagram is a compound word derived from the Greek neoclassical stems for "nine" (ennea) and something "written" or "drawn" (gramma). Enneagram may refer to:

 Enneagram (geometry), a nine-sided star polygon with various configurations 
 Enneagram of Personality, a model of human personality illustrated by an enneagram figure
 Fourth Way enneagram, a diagram used in the teachings of G. I. Gurdjieff and others associated with the Fourth Way school

See also
 Gram (disambiguation)
 Enneagon, a nine-sided polygon
 Ennead, a group of nine Egyptian deities given the Greek name Enneás, a calque of the Egyptian name meaning "the Nine"